Au Cap is an administrative district of Seychelles located on the island of Mahé.

Au Cap has a surface area of 875 hectares. It is bordered to the north by the district of Anse Aux Pins, to the south by the district of Anse Royale, to the west by the district of Anse Boileau and to the east by the Indian Ocean. The maximum latitude is 600 meters.

There are 12 sub-districts in Au Cap:
Turtle Bay 1 and 2
Au Cap
Reef Estate 1, 3 and 4
Reef Estate – Longue Mare 
Green Estate
Anse Aux Pins – Hermit Estate
Montagne Posée
Pointe Au Sel - Upper Moripa
Pointe Au Sel 1 and 2
Pointe Au Sel, Sadeco area 
Au Cap
Montagne Posée

While there are numerous secondary roads allowing vehicles circulation within and to and from other neighboring districts, the main recorded connections are the primary roads. Since Au Cap is closed to the west by the mountain range and to the east by the ocean, the easiest access routes are from the north, through Anse Aux Pins and from the south, through Anse Royale. This is called the East Coast Road. However, a third primary road goes through Au Cap, crossing the mountain range and entering Anse Boileau. This is called the Montagne Posée Road.

There are also countless tertiary paths and routes within and to Au Cap from its neighbors.

From a 2002 census, the population then stood at 2,648 citizens, with 1,343 females and 1,305 males. Most of this population lies in the 0–15 years range, with about 30% of the district's population. On the other end of the scale, the ‘over 60’ range consists of only about 8% of the population. There are more females than males in the district but in two designated categories out of six, the ’15-30’ and the ‘60-75’ categories, males outnumber females by 1 and 22 respectively.

References

Districts of Seychelles
Mahé, Seychelles